The Last Kind Words is the third studio album by American heavy metal band DevilDriver, released in the United States on July 31, 2007. It was released in the United Kingdom on June 19.

The album debuted at number 48 on the U.S. Billboard 200, selling about 14,000 copies in its first week. "Clouds Over California" is available for playable download in the video game Rock Band.

Track listing

Personnel 
DevilDriver
 Dez Fafara – vocals
 Mike Spreitzer – lead guitar
 Jeff Kendrick – rhythm guitar
 Jon Miller – bass
 John Boecklin – drums

Additional musicians
 Simon Fafara – vocals on "Tirades of Truth"

Production
 Jason Suecof – production, engineering
 Andy Sneap – mixing
 Mark Lewis – engineering

Charts

References

External links 
 
 The Last Kind Words at DevilDriver's official website
 The Last Kind Words at Roadrunner Records

2007 albums
DevilDriver albums
Roadrunner Records albums
Albums produced by Jason Suecof
Albums recorded at Sonic Ranch